Makoto Satō may refer to:

, Japanese actor
 Makoto Satō (theatre) (佐藤 信, born 1943), Japanese theater director and playwright
, Japanese film director
 Makoto Satō (baseball) (佐藤 誠, born 1975), player for the Fukuoka SoftBank Hawks